The 184th Paratroopers Regiment "Nembo" is a unit of the Italian Army based in Livorno in Tuscany. Formed in 1942 and active during World War II the regiment is part of the army's infantry arm's Paracadutisti speciality. On 4 October 2022 the regiment's name, flag, and traditions were assigned to the Command and Tactical Supports Unit "Folgore" of the Paratroopers Brigade "Folgore".

The regiment was the fourth Italian paratroopers regiment to be formed. The regiment was assigned to the 184th Paratroopers Division "Nembo", with which the regiment deployed to Sardinia. After the announcement of the Armistice of Cassibile on 8 September 1943 the regiment joined the Italian Co-belligerent Army and fought against the Germans in the Italian campaign. In September 1944 the remnants of the regiment and of its sister regiment the 183rd Infantry Regiment "Nembo" were merged to form the Paratroopers Regiment "Nembo", which continued to serve on the allied side for the rest of the war. In 2022 the regiment was reformed as a command and tactical supports unit.

History 

The 184th Infantry Regiment "Nembo" was formed on 24 August 1942 in Florence with the XII, and XIII paratroopers battalions, which had been formed at the Royal Italian Air Force Paratroopers School in Tarquinia. Later the regiment was joined by the XIV Paratroopers Battalion and the 184th Cannons Company, which was equipped with 47/32 anti-tank guns. On 1 November 1942 the regiment entered the newly formed 184th Paratroopers Division "Nembo", with which it served during World War II.

The regiment was in Sardinia when the Armistice of Cassibile was announced on 8 September 1943. While the division remained loyal to King Victor Emmanuel III of Italy the XII Paratroopers Battalion of the 184th Infantry Regiment "Nembo" sided with the Germans and retreated with the 90th Panzergrenadier Division to Corsica.

In May 1944 the division was transferred from Sardinia to southern Italy, where it joined the Italian Co-belligerent Army's Italian Liberation Corps. On 22 May 1944 the 184th Infantry Regiment "Nembo" entered combat against the Germans, followed on 31 May by the rest of the division. After having suffered heavy losses fighting on the allied side in the Italian campaign the division's remnants were used to form the Combat Group "Folgore" on 24 September 1944. On 30 September 1944 the 184th Infantry Regiment "Nembo" and its sister regiment the 183rd Infantry Regiment "Nembo" were merged and formed the Paratroopers Regiment "Nembo", which continued to serve on the allied side for the rest of the war.

2022 Reactivation 
On 4 October 2022 the name, flag and traditions of the 184th Infantry Regiment "Nembo" were assigned to the Command and Tactical Supports Unit "Folgore" of the Paratroopers Brigade "Folgore", which on that date was renamed 184th Paratroopers Command and Tactical Supports Unit "Nembo".

After its reactivation the unit is organized as follows:

 184th Paratroopers Command and Tactical Supports Unit "Nembo", in Livorno
 Command Company
 Signal Company

See also 
 Paratroopers Brigade "Folgore"

External links
 Italian Army Website: 183rd Paratroopers Regiment "Nembo"

References

Paracadutisti Regiments of Italy